Afrosphinx is a genus of moths in the family Sphingidae, containing one species, Afrosphinx amabilis, which is known from Zambia and the Democratic Republic of the Congo. The habitat consists of Brachystegia woodland.

References

Smerinthini
Moths of Africa
Insects of Angola
Insects of Tanzania
Insects of Zambia
Monotypic moth genera
Taxa named by Robert Herbert Carcasson